Didac Rodríguez González (born 20 February 1985), commonly known as Didi or also as The son of the wind , is a Spanish footballer who plays for Sant Cugat EFC as a winger.

Football career
Didi was born in Barcelona, Catalonia. An unsuccessful youth graduate at local – and La Liga – giants FC Barcelona, he started his senior career in 2005 with Racing de Santander B in the third division. Two years later he moved to another reserve team, Atlético Madrid B, also playing in that tier.

After an unassuming spell in Bulgaria with PFC Slavia Sofia, Didi returned to his country and joined CD Dénia, still in the third level.

References

External links

1985 births
Living people
Footballers from Barcelona
Spanish footballers
Association football wingers
Segunda División B players
Tercera División players
Rayo Cantabria players
Atlético Madrid B players
UE Cornellà players
FC Santboià players
First Professional Football League (Bulgaria) players
PFC Slavia Sofia players
Spanish expatriate footballers
Expatriate footballers in Bulgaria